Tania Weber (real name Tanja Sarsgardeer; born 18 August 1926) is a Finnish retired actress, best known for her many roles in 1950s Italian films.

Filmography
Heroic Charge (1952) — as Kalina Ifienov
Roman Holiday (1953) — as Francesca (uncredited)
The Unfaithfuls (1953) — as L'amica di Lulla
The Ship of Condemned Women (1953) — as Isabella
Siamo tutti inquilini (1953) — as Lulù
Funniest Show on Earth (1953) —  as Sonia
A Day in Court (1954) — as Elena
Ulysses (1954) — as Leucantes

References

External links

1926 births
Possibly living people
Actresses from Helsinki
Finnish expatriates in Italy